Below the Root is an adventure game released in 1984 by Windham Classics, a division of Spinnaker Software. It is titled after Below the Root, the first of the Green Sky Trilogy of novels, written by Zilpha Keatley Snyder and published between 1975 and 1977. It is an early example of what later became known as the Metroidvania genre.

The player can assume the role of one of five characters with different abilities, a member of one of two races—the Kindar or the Erdling—and attempt to settle the existing differences between the two groups.

History
The game was based on a series of books by Zilpha Keatley Snyder. Explaining how the game came about, she wrote:

"Like so many of my books, the trilogy's deepest root goes back to my early childhood when I played a game that involved crossing a grove of oak trees by climbing from tree to tree, because something incredibly dangerous lived "below the root." Years later when I was writing The Changeling I recalled the game, and in the course of embellishing it for that story, became intrigued with the idea of returning to the world of Green-sky for a longer stay. The return trip took three years and produced three more books. Initially published in 1975, 1976, and 1977, the trilogy was later reincarnated as a computer game (published by Spinnaker Software of Cambridge, MA).

The computer game transpired when I was contacted by a young computer programmer named Dale Disharoon. After Dale introduced me to the world of computer games, I wrote and charted, Dale programmed, and a young artist named Bill Groetzinger made marvelous graphics for a game that takes off from where the third book of the trilogy ends."

The original world of Green-sky first appeared in Snyder's novel The Changeling, where it was a fantasy world conceived by two schoolgirls. As such, it featured princes and princesses, wicked queens and familiar fairytale situations. However, many of the details appeared in the later novels. Green-sky as the girls imagined it is a low-gravity planet whose residents live in "softly rocking" houses built in the branches of enormous trees and "glide like blowing leaves" between the branches; "nothing was ever killed under the green sky" and the people live on a wide variety of fruits and nuts; they have brightly colored monkeys and songbirds for pets. Their skin is pale green, and their hair is darker green, often blossoming naturally into flowers. Below the ground live creatures of unspeakable evil, which must not be allowed to penetrate into the upper world.

Premise
The Kindar of Green-sky were a utopian and strictly pacifistic society, ruled by leaders known as the Ol-zhaan, whom the average Kindar believed to be godlike. "Unjoyful" emotions like anger and sorrow were banned, and kept under strict control by a system of meditation, chant and ritual, accompanied by the use of narcotic berries (which some people, including little children, overuse). The people were vegetarians, although they did eat eggs, and kept brightly colored monkeys, songbirds and occasionally small tree bears as pets. The books establish them as descendants of European Caucasians, orphans who fled Earth due to war. Supporting this, many of the "alien" terms, such as "sima" for tree-monkey, "grund" for tree, and D'ol being a corrupted form of "Doctor," are clearly rooted in Latin, German, or French. Infants were born with paranormal powers, which should be retained into adulthood, but were disappearing earlier with each successive generation. The people lived in fear of the forest floor and the pash-shan, legendary monsters said to stalk below the roots of their magnificent tree-cities.

In the books, a novice Ol-zhaan named Raamo and his friend Neric (one of the game's playable characters) set out to discover if the monsters truly exist. What they found were the Erdlings, a dark-skinned race made up of exiled Kindar dissidents and their descendants. Where the Kindar live their whole lives in the shade, the Erdlings seek places where the sun penetrates the caverns.  They have been living in the caverns and subsisting on plants, mushrooms and the occasional unwary rabbit (lapan) or ground bird, plus fallen fruits from the Kindar orchards. They are superb craftsmen, metalworkers and jewelers; they have fire, which is unknown in Green-sky, and transport people and supplies by railway, using steam propulsion. They have no taboos against anger, sadness or other "unjoyful" emotions, and (possibly as a result) appear to have retained much more of their psychic powers than have the Kindar.

Their discovery shakes the very foundation of Green-sky's social order. The Erdlings are released from their exile and the Ol-zhaan disbanded, but reconciling the two societies takes a long time. An unnamed society of disgruntled Ol-zhaan (called Salite in the game) and the Nekom, vengeance-seeking Erdlings, began patrolling the branch-paths and causing unrest. Furthermore, Raamo himself apparently perished, silencing a voice for tolerance and unity.

In the game's manual, you are told that the wise old woman (and former Ol-zhaan high priestess) D'ol Falla has a vision, in which she heard these words: "The Spirit fades, in Darkness lying. A quest proclaim - the Light is dying." Your character (one of five from the series) then begins the game looking for clues to the meaning of D'ol Falla's vision in hopes of restoring peace to both nations.

Gameplay

This game was highly ambitious and had many subtle and clever details woven into its universe. First of all were the social norms of Green-Sky. Theft and violence were alien concepts to most of the books' characters. Therefore, one could not (as is common with adventure games) simply walk into a room and pocket an unattended object. One had to find the owner of the object and ask permission, buy the object with money (called tokens) in a shop, or locate the object in a public area. In the books, the Kindar economy was a moneyless quasi-communism; it was the Erdlings who used tokens and were used to being able to buy whatever they could afford.

Particularly interesting was the extremely low level of violence in the game. The player could be hurt only by falling, coming into contact with snakes or tree spiders (invented for the game), or walking into walls. These incidents merely resulted in a jarring "bump" sound effect and an animation of the character crouching and rubbing their head, as if recovering from a nasty knock, rather than any gruesome or graphic injury. The worst that could happen would be your shuba tearing, so that you could no longer glide until you obtained a new one. Even the occasional adversary did not hurt one's character grievously, although one did slowly lose health points and game time, and might find oneself sent back to one's nid-place (house) with an ominous notice that "you were found unconscious."

Alternately, your character could be kidnapped and held prisoner by the racist factions of the Salite or Nekom in one of the two "prison houses" in the game. A player with no other way to escape these prisons (or who found themselves otherwise trapped) could "renew", which was essentially a process of slipping briefly into a sort of recuperative coma, which resulted, as with the loss of all health points, in a loss of game time and the character returning to their nid-place (again, assuring that the character could never actually die during the game).

In the Nekom "prison house," you could find a machete (called a "wand of Befal" after Axon Befal, the Erdling faction's leader), but its primary use was to cut thick vegetation. If you killed people with this blade, there were serious, permanent penalties to your abilities. Taking lives would essentially make the game unwinnable, which is consistent with the themes expressed in the original story.

It was among the first games that offered a choice of multiple protagonists, as well as a choice of gender, age, race, and beginning level of psychic powers (referred to as "Spirit-skills"). Furthermore, people treated the characters differently based on your choice of avatar. A child character could be invited to play. Erdling characters could be given a chilly reception at some Kindar houses and vice versa. Consistent with the books, these people were portrayed as being opposed to any alliances between the two cultures, and thus had to be avoided whenever possible. Pensing to read thoughts and emotions when encountering a stranger provided clues to their attitudes and distinguished friend from foe. While the game's technology limited the extent of these features, they were certainly present.

Another interesting detail is that the vegetarian Kindar characters did not get much nutrition out of eating meat, and temporarily lost psychic abilities. Likewise, the narcotic Wissenberries were somewhat more health-damaging to Erdling characters. In the books, Kindar — even children — often used the berries in rituals and ceremony, as well as recreationally, and for relief of physical and emotional pain.

Most of the gameplay focused on the challenges of getting the character to move around the game world.  Various objects in the game were used for this. Of primary importance was the shuba, a flying-squirrel-like garment which allows the character to glide diagonally instead of falling, and also prevented the character from being hurt by falls. Along the way, one learns a variety of "Spirit skills" or psychic abilities of progressive difficulty. The Spirit-skills, which included telepathy (called "pensing"), telekinesis (called "kiniporting") and the ability to make tree branches grow to create temporary bridges across impassible gaps ("grunspreking") are the key to making progress in the game world and achieving the ultimate goal. Communicating with animals as well as people through telepathy is vital to enhancing the character's Spirit-skills.

The graphics were exquisitely colored, highly advanced for the time. Users have described the deeply evocative and compelling qualities of the images as being one of the main reasons they kept playing. Snyder's husband Larry wrote a number of bell-like musical phrases very much in the style of the choral chant important to both cultures as described in the books. As in today's games, these pieces are heard when an important discovery is made or the player gains important skills or advances.

The game is a direct sequel to the books, and is meant by the author to be taken as canon. It originated in Snyder's realization that one of her final plot elements had been a huge mistake. She was being flooded with mail from adults and children, but could not see any way to change the ending now that the book was on the market. In addition, she had believed the event she described to be necessary to the ultimate resolution of the plot. Introduced to the concept of computer games, Snyder saw a way to redeem the situation while keeping and even advancing the original plot. The object of the game is to solve the mystery of what really happened.

References

External links
 
 Below the Root at GameFAQs

1984 video games
Adventure games
Apple II games
Commodore 64 games
Metroidvania games
Video games about plants
Video games based on novels
Video games developed in the United States
Video games set in forests
Single-player video games